Israel competed at the 2017 Summer Universiade also known as the XXIX Summer Universiade, in Taipei, Taiwan.

Archery

Recurve

Key
N/A = Round not applicable for the event
Bye = Athlete not required to compete in round

Athletics

Men
Track & road events

Field events

Key
Q = Qualified for the next round
q = Qualified for the next round as a fastest loser or, in field events, by position without achieving the qualifying target
SB = Season Best
NM = No Mark
DNS = Did No Start

Basketball

Men's tournament

Roster

Preliminary Round

|}

Quarterfinals

Fencing

Men

Women

Golf

Judo

Men

Women

Swimming

Men

Women

Weightlifting

References

Summer Universiade
Nations at the 2017 Summer Universiade
Israel at the Summer Universiade